The Bloc for Democracy and African Integration was a political party in Mali.

History
The party was established in April 1993.

The 2007 elections saw the party affiliate with the Alliance for Democracy and Progress that supported President Amadou Toumani Touré. It won 2 out of 160 seats in the National Assembly.

In August 2010 it merged with the Sudanese Union – African Democratic Rally to form the Malian Union for the African Democratic Rally.

References

Defunct political parties in Mali
Pan-Africanism in Mali
Pan-Africanist political parties in Africa
Political parties disestablished in 2010